Drillham South is a rural locality in the Western Downs Region, Queensland, Australia.

References 

Western Downs Region
Localities in Queensland